Dysthymia, also known as persistent depressive disorder (PDD), is a mental and behavioral disorder, specifically a disorder primarily of mood, consisting of similar cognitive and physical problems as major depressive disorder, but with longer-lasting symptoms. The concept was used by Robert Spitzer as a replacement for the term "depressive personality" in the late 1970s.

In the Diagnostic and Statistical Manual of Mental Disorders (DSM-IV), dysthymia is a serious state of chronic depression, which persists for at least two years (one year for children and adolescents). Dysthymia is not a minor form of major depressive disorder, and for some may be more disabling.

As dysthymia is a chronic disorder, those with the condition may experience symptoms for many years before it is diagnosed, if diagnosis occurs at all. As a result, they may believe that depression is a part of their character, so they may not even discuss their symptoms with doctors, family members or friends. In the DSM-5, dysthymia is replaced by persistent depressive disorder. This new condition includes both chronic major depressive disorder and the previous dysthymic disorder. The reason for this change is that there was no evidence for meaningful differences between these two conditions.

Signs and symptoms
Dysthymia characteristics include an extended period of depressed mood combined with at least two other symptoms which may include insomnia or hypersomnia, fatigue or low energy, eating changes (more or less), low self-esteem, or feelings of hopelessness. Poor concentration or difficulty making decisions are treated as another possible symptom. Irritability is one of the more common symptoms in children and adolescents.

Mild degrees of dysthymia may result in people withdrawing from stress and avoiding opportunities for failure. In more severe cases of dysthymia, people may withdraw from daily activities. They will usually find little pleasure in usual activities and pastimes.

Diagnosis of dysthymia can be difficult because of the subtle nature of the symptoms and patients can often hide them in social situations, making it challenging for others to detect symptoms. Additionally, dysthymia often occurs at the same time as other psychological disorders, which adds a level of complexity in determining the presence of dysthymia, particularly because there is often an overlap in the symptoms of disorders.

There is a high incidence of comorbid illness in those with dysthymia. Suicidal behavior is also a particular problem with those with dysthymia. It is vital to look for signs of major depression, panic disorder, generalised anxiety disorder, alcohol and substance use disorders, and personality disorder.

Causes
There are no known biological causes that apply consistently to all cases of dysthymia, which suggests diverse origin of the disorder. However, there are some indications that there is a genetic predisposition to dysthymia: "The rate of depression in the families of people with dysthymia is as high as fifty percent for the early-onset form of the disorder". Other factors linked with dysthymia include stress, social isolation, and lack of social support.

In a study using identical and fraternal twins, results indicated that there is a stronger likelihood of identical twins both having depression than fraternal twins. This provides support for the idea that dysthymia is in part caused by heredity means.

Co-occurring conditions
Dysthymia often co-occurs with other mental disorders. A "double depression" is the occurrence of episodes of major depression in addition to dysthymia. Switching between periods of dysthymic moods and periods of hypomanic moods is indicative of cyclothymia, which is a mild variant of bipolar disorder.

"At least three-quarters of patients with dysthymia also have a chronic physical illness or another psychiatric disorder such as one of the anxiety disorders, cyclothymia, drug addiction, or alcoholism". Common co-occurring conditions include major depression (up to 75%), anxiety disorders (up to 50%), personality disorders (up to 40%), somatoform disorders (up to 45%) and substance use disorders (up to 50%). People with dysthymia have a higher-than-average chance of developing major depression. A 10-year follow-up study found that 95% of dysthymia patients had an episode of major depression. When an intense episode of depression occurs on top of dysthymia, the state is called "double depression."

Double depression 

Double depression occurs when a person experiences a major depressive episode on top of the already-existing condition of dysthymia. It is difficult to treat, as patients accept these major depressive symptoms as a natural part of their personality or as a part of their life that is outside of their control. The fact that people with dysthymia may accept these worsening symptoms as inevitable can delay treatment. When and if such people seek out treatment, the treatment may not be very effective if only the symptoms of the major depression are addressed, but not the dysthymic symptoms. Patients with double depression tend to report significantly higher levels of hopelessness than is normal. This can be a useful symptom for mental health services providers to focus on when working with patients to treat the condition. Additionally, cognitive therapies can be effective for working with people with double depression in order to help change negative thinking patterns and give individuals a new way of seeing themselves and their environment.

It has been suggested that the best way to prevent double depression is by treating the dysthymia. A combination of antidepressants and cognitive therapies can be helpful in preventing major depressive symptoms from occurring. Additionally, exercise and good sleep hygiene (e.g., improving sleep patterns) are thought to have an additive effect on treating dysthymic symptoms and preventing them from worsening.

Pathophysiology
There is evidence that there may be neurological indicators of early onset dysthymia. There are several brain structures (corpus callosum and frontal lobe) that are different in women with dysthymia than in those without dysthymia. This may indicate that there is a developmental difference between these two groups.

Another study, which used fMRI techniques to assess the differences between individuals with dysthymia and other people, found additional support for neurological indicators of the disorder. This study found several areas of the brain that function differently. The amygdala (associated with processing emotions such as fear) was more activated in dysthymia patients. The study also observed increased activity in the insula (which is associated with sad emotions). Finally, there was increased activity in the cingulate gyrus (which serves as the bridge between attention and emotion).

A study comparing healthy individuals to people with dysthymia indicates there are other biological indicators of the disorder. An anticipated result appeared as healthy individuals expected fewer negative adjectives to apply to them, whereas people with dysthymia expected fewer positive adjectives to apply to them in the future. Biologically these groups are also differentiated in that healthy individuals showed greater neurological anticipation for all types of events (positive, neutral, or negative) than those with dysthymia. This provides neurological evidence of the dulling of emotion that individuals with dysthymia have learned to use to protect themselves from overly strong negative feelings, compared to healthy people.

There is some evidence of a genetic basis for all types of depression, including dysthymia. A study using identical and fraternal twins indicated that there is a stronger likelihood of identical twins both having depression than fraternal twins. This provides support for the idea that dysthymia is caused in part by heredity.

A new model has recently surfaced in the literature regarding the HPA axis (structures in the brain that get activated in response to stress) and its involvement with dysthymia (e.g. phenotypic variations of corticotropin releasing hormone (CRH) and arginine vasopressin (AVP), and down-regulation of adrenal functioning) as well as forebrain serotonergic mechanisms. Since this model is highly provisional, further research is still needed.

Diagnosis
The Diagnostic and Statistical Manual of Mental Disorders IV (DSM-IV), published by the American Psychiatric Association, characterizes dysthymic disorder. The essential symptom involves the individual feeling depressed for the majority of days, and parts of the day, for at least two years. Low energy, disturbances in sleep or in appetite, and low self-esteem typically contribute to the clinical picture as well. Those with the condition have often experienced dysthymia for many years before it is diagnosed. People around them often describe them in words similar to "just a moody person". The following are the diagnostic criteria:

 During a majority of days for two years or more, the adult patient reports depressed mood, or appears depressed to others for most of the day.
 When depressed, the patient has two or more of:
 decreased or increased appetite;
 decreased or increased sleep (insomnia or hypersomnia);
 fatigue or low energy;
 reduced self-esteem;
 decreased concentration or problems making decisions;
 feelings of hopelessness or pessimism.
 During this two-year period, the above symptoms are never absent longer than two consecutive months.
 During the duration of the two-year period, the patient may have had a perpetual major depressive episode.
 The patient has not had any manic, hypomanic, or mixed episodes.
 The patient has never fulfilled criteria for cyclothymic disorder.
 The depression does not exist only as part of a chronic psychosis (such as schizophrenia or delusional disorder).
 The symptoms are often not directly caused by a medical illness or by substances, including substance use or other medications.
 The symptoms may cause significant problems or distress in social, work, academic, or other major areas of life functioning.

In children and adolescents, mood can be irritable, and duration must be at least one year, in contrast to two years needed for diagnosis in adults.

Early onset (diagnosis before age 21) is associated with more frequent relapses, psychiatric hospitalizations, and more co-occurring conditions. For younger adults with dysthymia, there is a higher co-occurrence in personality abnormalities and the symptoms are likely chronic. However, in older adults with dysthymia, the psychological symptoms are associated with medical conditions and/or stressful life events and losses.

Dysthymia can be contrasted with major depressive disorder by assessing the acute nature of the symptoms. Dysthymia is far more chronic (long lasting) than major depressive disorder, in which symptoms may be present for as little as two weeks. Also dysthymia often presents itself at an earlier age than major depressive disorder.

Prevention
Though there is no clear-cut way to prevent dysthymia from occurring, there are some suggestions to help reduce its effects. Since dysthymia often appears first in childhood, it is important to identify children who may be at risk. It may be beneficial to work with children in helping to control their stress, increase resilience, boost self-esteem, and provide strong social support networks. These tactics may be helpful in warding off or delaying dysthymic symptoms.

Treatments

Persistent depressive disorder can be treated with psychotherapy and pharmacotherapy. The overall rate and degree of treatment success is somewhat lower than for non-chronic depression, and a combination of psychotherapy and pharmacotherapy shows best results.

Therapy

Psychotherapy can be effective in treating dysthymia.
In a meta-analytic study from 2010, psychotherapy had a small but significant effect when compared to control groups. However, psychotherapy is significantly less effective than pharmacotherapy in direct comparisons.

There are many different types of therapy, and some are more effective than others.

 The empirically most studied type of treatment is cognitive-behavioral therapy. This type of therapy is very effective for non-chronic depression, and it appears to be also effective for chronic depression.
 Cognitive behavioral analysis system of psychotherapy (CBASP) has been designed specifically to treat PDD. Empirical results on this form of therapy are inconclusive: While one study showed remarkably high treatment success rates, a later, even larger study showed no significant benefit of adding CBASP to treatment with antidepressants.
 Schema therapy and psychodynamic psychotherapy have been used for PDD, though good empirical results are lacking.
 Interpersonal psychotherapy has also been said to be effective in treating the disorder, though it only shows marginal benefit when added to treatment with antidepressants.

Medications 

In a 2010 meta-analysis, the benefit of pharmacotherapy was limited to selective serotonin reuptake inhibitors (SSRIs) rather than tricyclic antidepressants (TCA).

According to a 2014 meta-analysis, antidepressants are at least as effective for persistent depressive disorder as for major depressive disorder.
The first line of pharmacotherapy is usually SSRIs due to their purported more tolerable nature and reduced side effects compared to the irreversible monoamine oxidase inhibitors or tricyclic antidepressants. Studies have found that the mean response to antidepressant medications for people with dysthymia is 55%, compared with a 31% response rate to a placebo. The most commonly prescribed antidepressants/SSRIs for dysthymia are escitalopram, citalopram, sertraline, fluoxetine, paroxetine, and fluvoxamine. It often takes an average of 6–8 weeks before the patient begins to feel these medications' therapeutic effects. Additionally, STAR*D, a multi-clinic governmental study, found that people with overall depression will generally need to try different brands of medication before finding one that works specifically for them. Research shows that 1 in 4 of those who switch medications get better results regardless of whether the second medication is an SSRI or some other type of antidepressant.

In a meta-analytic study from 2005, it was found that SSRIs and TCAs are equally effective in treating dysthymia. They also found that MAOIs have a slight advantage over the use of other medication in treating this disorder. However, the author of this study cautions that MAOIs should not necessarily be the first line of defense in the treatment of dysthymia, as they are often less tolerable than their counterparts, such as SSRIs.

Tentative evidence supports the use of amisulpride to treat dysthymia but with increased side effects.

Combination treatment
When pharmacotherapy alone is compared with combined treatment with pharmacotherapy plus psychotherapy, there is a strong trend in favour of combined treatment. Working with a psychotherapist to address the causes and effects of the disorder, in addition to taking antidepressants to help eliminate the symptoms, can be extremely beneficial. This combination is often the preferred method of treatment for those who have dysthymia. Looking at various studies involving treatment for dysthymia, 75% of people responded positively to a combination of cognitive behavioral therapy (CBT) and pharmacotherapy, whereas only 48% of people responded positively to just CBT or medication alone.

A 2019 Cochrane review of 10 studies involving 840 participants could not conclude with certainty that continued pharmacotherapy with antidepressants (those used in the studies) was effective in preventing relapse or recurrence of persistent depressive disorder. The body of evidence was too small for any greater certainty although the study acknowledges that continued psychotherapy may be beneficial when compared to no treatment.

Resistance
Because of dysthymia's chronic nature, treatment resistance is somewhat common. In such a case, augmentation is often recommended. Such treatment augmentations can include lithium pharmacology, thyroid hormone augmentation, amisulpride, buspirone, bupropion, Guanfacine, stimulants, and mirtazapine. Additionally, if the person also has seasonal affective disorder, light therapy can be useful in helping augment therapeutic effects.

Epidemiology
Globally dysthymia occurs in about 105 million people a year (1.5% of the population). It is 38% more common in women (1.8% of women) than in men (1.3% of men). The lifetime prevalence rate of dysthymia in community settings appears to range from 3 to 6% in the United States. However, in primary care settings the rate is higher ranging from 5 to 15 percent. United States prevalence rates tend to be somewhat higher than rates in other countries.

See also
 Anhedonia, a symptom of dysthymia characterized by a decreased or absent ability to enjoy a sense of pleasure
 Atypical depression
 Blunted affect, a symptom of PTSD, schizophrenia, and ASPD involving decreased or absent emotional response
 Dysphoria, a state of feeling unwell or unhappy
 Epigenetics of depression
 List of medications used to treat major depressive disorder or dysthymia

References

External links
 NIMH Depression Page

Bipolar spectrum
Depression (mood)
Mood disorders